Gymnosporangium kernianum is a fungal plant pathogen.

References

External links

Fungal plant pathogens and diseases
Fungi described in 1911
Pucciniales